The name Brooke is a very common female given name and uncommonly a male given name, also used as a surname. The name Brooke was most popular in the early 1990s. Other forms of Brooke include Brook. The name "Brooke" is of English origin.

Notable people with the given name Brooke
Brooke is a given name. It is a variant of the name Brook. People with this name include:

Female
 Brooke Alexander (born 1963), American beauty queen and actress
 Brooke Anderson (born 1978), American television personality
 Brooke Astor (1902–2007), socialite and philanthropist
 Brooke Baldwin (born 1979), American television personality
 Brooke Bennett (born 1980), American swimmer
 Brooke Bundy (born 1944), American actress
 Brooke Burfitt (born 1988), English actress and radio presenter
 Brooke Burke (born 1971), American actress, dancer, model, and television personality
 Brooke Burns (born 1978),  American model, actress, and television personality
 Brooke Castile (born 1986), American figure skater
 Brooke Fraser (born 1983), New Zealand singer-songwriter
 Brooke Hanson (born 1978), Australian swimmer
 Brooke Harrington, American economic sociologist
 Brooke Henderson (born 1997), Canadian golfer
 Brooke Hogan (born 1988), American singer, daughter of wrestler Hulk Hogan, actress
 Brooke Kinsella (born 1983), British actress
 Brooke Krueger-Billett (born 1980), Australian hammer thrower
 Brooke Morrison (born 1979), Australian hockey player
 Brooke Nicholls, Canadian singer and songwriter
 Brooke Richards, model
 Brooke E. Sheldon (1931–2013), American librarian
 Brooke Scullion (born 1999), Irish singer, Eurovision contestant
 Brooke Shields (born 1965), actress and model
 Brooke Shipley, American mathematician
 Brooke Tessmacher (born 1984), American wrestler
 Brooke Valentine (born 1984), American singer-songwriter
 Brooke Vincent (born 1992), English actress
 Brooke White (born 1983), American folk-pop singer and American Idol contestant

Male
 Brooke Benjamin (1929–1995), English mathematical physicist and mathematician
 Brooke Makler (1951–2010), American Olympic fencer
 Brooke McEldowney (born 1952), cartoonist
 Brooke Nihart (1919–2006), American marine, Navy Cross recipient and historian
 Brooke Stevens, American fantasy and thriller writer

Fictional characters
 Brooke Armstrong, fictional character from Melrose Place
 Brooke Davis (One Tree Hill), fictional character in the CW television series One Tree Hill
 Brooke Logan, fictional character in the CBS soap opera The Bold and the Beautiful
 Brooke Lohst, fictional character in the book Be More Chill
 Brooke Page, fictional character in the Mattel franchise Ever After High

See also 
 Brooke (disambiguation)

References 

English unisex given names
Unisex given names